Charlotte Payne (born 20 March 2002) is a British hammer thrower, who won the hammer throw event at the 2022 British Athletics Championships, and came second at the 2022 European Throwing Cup. Payne is deaf, and holds the world record for a deaf woman in the hammer throw.

Early life
Payne was diagnosed as deaf at the age of three, and told that it would impact her balance. Payne started competing in sports at the age of six. After trying sprinting, long jump and shot put, she started competing in the hammer throw in 2013. Her first event was the Berkshire Championships, where she set a championship record. Payne is from Reading, Berkshire, England, and as of 2022, she lived in Cold Ash in Berkshire.

Career
Payne trains at Reading Athletic Club. She was selected for the 2020 European Throwing Cup, though the event was later cancelled due to the COVID-19 pandemic. At the 2021 European Athletics U20 Championships, Payne finished fourth in the hammer throw event, and was a captain of the British team. In December 2021, she was included in the British Athletics Futures programme. Payne was not selected for the 2022 Commonwealth Games, as Anna Purchase was chosen instead.

Payne came second in the hammer throw event at the 2022 European Throwing Cup. Later in the year, she won the hammer throw events at the under-23 and senior England Athletics Championships, and competed at the 2022 European Athletics Championships. In December 2022, she was nominated for the British Deaf Sports Personality of the Year award.

References

External links
 

2002 births
Living people
English female hammer throwers
Deaf competitors in athletics
English deaf people
Sportspeople from Reading, Berkshire